Arctiocossus danieli is a moth in the family Cossidae described by Harry Kendon Clench in 1959. It is found in Namibia and South Africa.

References

Cossinae
Moths described in 1959
Moths of Africa